This is a list of Yellowstone (American TV series) characters.

Yellowstone is an American neo-Western drama television series created by Taylor Sheridan and John Linson that premiered on June 20, 2018, on Paramount Network. The series follows the conflicts along the shared borders of the Yellowstone Ranch, a large cattle ranch, the Broken Rock Indian reservation, Yellowstone National Park and land developers.

Cast Overview
 Key
  Main cast (receives star billing) 
  Recurring cast (guest appearances in two or more episodes)
  Guest cast (appearing in one episode or credited as co-starring)

Main Cast

Recurring Cast

Guest Cast

Notes

Main Characters
 Kevin Costner as John Dutton III, a widowed sixth-generation patriarch of the Dutton family who owns and operates the Yellowstone Dutton Ranch, the largest contiguous ranch in the United States and also serves as Montana Livestock Commissioner. As the series progresses, he is continually challenged by those seeking to take control of the ranch's land. At the beginning of the fifth season, he becomes the Governor of Montana.
 Josh Lucas portrays a young John Dutton in the 1990s. (recurring seasons 1, 5; guest season 2).
 Luke Grimes as Kayce Dutton, a former US Navy SEAL, a Livestock Agent and John and Evelyn's youngest son. He initially lives on the Broken Rock Indian Reservation with his Native American wife and son before moving to the Yellowstone Ranch.
 Rhys Alterman portrays a young Kayce Dutton in the 1990s. (guest seasons 1–2)
 Kelly Reilly as Bethany "Beth" Dutton, a financier and John and Evelyn's only daughter. Although well-educated, highly intelligent, and a master manipulator, Beth is bitter, abrasive, and emotionally unstable. She is loyal and extremely protective of her father and after an on-again, off-again relationship with Rip Wheeler, they eventually marry.
 Kylie Rogers portrays a young Beth Dutton in the 1990s. (recurring season 5; guest seasons 1–3)
 Wes Bentley as James Michael "Jamie" Dutton, an aspiring politician and John and Evelyn's adopted son. As an infant, he was adopted after his biological father murdered his mother and went to prison. Once completely loyal to his father and family, their relentless intolerance of him eventually drives him to follow his own path. He has a mutually hateful relationship with his sister, Beth, which becomes more pronounced as the series progresses. In the third season, he becomes the attorney general for Montana. With his former assistant, he has a son named after him.
 Dalton Baker portrays a young Jamie Dutton in the 1990s. (guest seasons 1–3)
 Cole Hauser as Rip Wheeler, the ranch foreman at the Yellowstone Dutton Ranch and John's right-hand man and enforcer. Rip has worked on the ranch for many years and is fiercely loyal to John. He was taken in by the Duttons as a young runaway after killing his father, who murdered his mother and brother. Rip has had an on-again, off-again relationship with Beth since they were teenagers until they eventually get married.
 Kyle Red Silverstein portrays a young Rip Wheeler in the 1990s. (recurring season 5; guest seasons 1–3).
 Kelsey Asbille as Monica Long Dutton, Kayce's Native American wife and John's daughter-in-law. She is initially a teacher at a local school on the Broken Rock Indian Reservation and later becomes a professor at Montana State University in Bozeman.
 Brecken Merrill as Tate Dutton, Kayce and Monica's son and John's only biological grandchild.
 Jefferson White as Jimmy Hurdstrom, a ranch hand at Yellowstone and an amateur bronc rider. In the fourth season, he leaves Yellowstone to join the 6666 Ranch.
 Danny Huston as Dan Jenkins (seasons 1–2), a billionaire land developer from California whose main goal is to take the Yellowstone Ranch from John and his family
 Gil Birmingham as Chief Thomas Rainwater, the chief of the Broken Rock Indian Reservation who neighbours the Yellowstone Ranch. He seeks to reclaim the land that the Yellowstone Ranch is built on from the Duttons that he believes was stolen from the Native Americans who originally inhabited it.
 Forrie J. Smith as Lloyd Pierce (season 3–present; recurring seasons 1–2), a senior ranch hand at Yellowstone who has worked with John on the Yellowstone Ranch for many years.
 Forrest Smith (guest season 2) and Forrest Wilder (recurring season 5) portray a young Lloyd Pierce in the 1990s.
 Denim Richards as Colby Mayfield (season 3–present; recurring seasons 1–2), a ranch hand at Yellowstone and Teeter's boyfriend.
 Ian Bohen as Ryan (season 4–present; recurring seasons 1–3), a ranch hand at Yellowstone and a Montana Livestock Agent.
 Ryan Bingham as Walker (season 4–present; recurring seasons 1–3), a musician and former convict recruited as a ranch hand at Yellowstone by Rip Wheeler.
 Finn Little as Carter (season 4–present), a troubled teenager and orphan who is taken in by Beth Dutton and becomes a ranch hand at Yellowstone.
 Wendy Moniz as Senator Lynelle Perry (season 5; recurring seasons 1, 3; guest seasons 2, 4), the former Governor of Montana and John's love interest. At the beginning of the fifth season, she becomes the U.S. Senator for Montana.
 Jennifer Landon as Teeter (season 5; recurring seasons 3–4), a tough-talking ranch hand from Texas and Colby's girlfriend.
 Kathryn Kelly as Emily (season 5; recurring season 4), the chief vet technician for the 6666 Ranch and Jimmy's fiancée.
 Moses Brings Plenty as Mo (season 5; recurring seasons 1–4), Chief Rainwater's personal driver and bodyguard.

Recurring Characters
 Michael Nouri as Bob Schwartz (seasons 1–4), the CEO at the financial firm Schwartz & Meyer, where Beth Dutton is a partner
 Atticus Todd as Ben Waters (seasons 1–3), a tribal police officer.
 Rudy Ramos as Felix Long (season 1; guest seasons 2, 4), Monica's grandfather, and Tate's great-grandfather.
 Tokala Black Elk as Sam Stands Alone (season 1), a friend of the Long family.
 Luke Peckinpah as Fred Meyers (season 1), a ranch hand at Yellowstone.
 Walter C. Taylor III as Emmett Walsh (seasons 1, 5; guest seasons 3–4), an experienced elderly rancher and the chairman of the Stock Growers Association.
 David Cleveland Brown as Jason (seasons 1–2), Beth Dutton's assistant
 Timothy Carhart as Mike Stewart (seasons 1, 3; guest season 2), the former attorney general for Montana.
 Fredric Lehne as Carl Reynolds (season 1), a close friend of John Dutton
 Robert Mirabal as Principal Littlefield (season 1), a tribal school principal at Heartsong Middle School.
 Heather Hemmens as Melody Prescott (season 1), Dan Jenkins's real estate assistant.
 Katherine Cunningham as Christina (seasons 1–2, 4), Jamie Dutton's assistant during his political campaign for attorney general who later gives birth to his son.
 Michaela Conlin as Sarah Nguyen (season 1; guest season 2), an investigative reporter drawn to John Dutton and his family
 Hugh Dillon as Sheriff Donnie Haskell (seasons 2, 4; guest seasons 1, 3) the Sheriff of Park County, Montana.
 Jake Ream as Jake (season 2–present; guest season 1), a bespectacled ranch hand at Yellowstone.
 Tanaya Beatty as Avery (seasons 2, 4; guest season 1), a former stripper recruited by Rip as a ranch hand at Yellowstone
 Steven Williams as "Cowboy" (season 2), a veteran cowboy whose real name is unknown.
 Neal McDonough as Malcolm Beck (season 2), a rival businessman and nemesis to John Dutton
 Terry Serpico as Teal Beck (season 2), Malcolm's brother and business partner.
 Kelly Rohrbach as Cassidy Reid (season 2), a prosecutor, and former rodeo queen.
 Martin Sensmeier as Martin (season 2), Monica's physical therapist. Sensmeier also portrays Sam in 1883.
 James Jordan as Steve Hendon (season 2–present), a livestock agent who works with Kayce. Jordan also portrays Cookie in 1883.
 Lane Garrison as Ray (season 2), a meth dealer and old friend of Jimmy
 Ryan Dorsey as Blake (season 2), a meth dealer who works with Ray.
 Gabriel "Gator" Guilbeau as Gator (seasons 2, 4–present; guest season 3), the personal chef for the Dutton family.
 Wolé Parks as Torry (season 2), the head of security for Dan Jenkins.
 Ethan Lee as Ethan (season 3–present), a newly hired ranch hand at Yellowstone.
 Josh Holloway as Roarke Morris (season 3; guest season 4), a rancher and stockholder for Market Equities, who seek to claim Yellowstone for real estate.
 John Emmet Tracy as Ellis Steele (season 3–present), a real estate representative for Market Equities.
 Q'orianka Kilcher as Angela Blue Thunder (seasons 3, 5), a tribal lawyer working with Chief Rainwater.
 Boots Southerland as Wade Morrow (season 3), a neighbouring rancher to Yellowstone.
 Brent Walker as Clint Morrow (season 3), Wade's son and a ranch hand.
 Karen Pittman as Willa Hayes (season 3), the former CEO of Market Equities.
 Eden Brolin as Mia (seasons 3–4), a barrel racer and Jimmy's ex-girlfriend
 Hassie Harrison as Laramie (season 3–present), a barrel racer, Mia's friend, and Walker's girlfriend.
 Taylor Sheridan as Travis Wheatly (season 4; guest seasons 1–2), a horse trader and an acquaintance of John Dutton. Sheridan is the co-creator of Yellowstone and also portrays Charles Goodnight in 1883.
 Maria Julian as Kate (season 4–present; guest season 3), the assistant to the Attorney General of Montana.
 Will Patton as Garrett Randall (season 4; guest season 3), Jamie's biological father.
 Jacki Weaver as Caroline Warner (season 4–present), the chairperson for the board of directors for Market Equities who hopes to build an airport and ski resort on Yellowstone.
 Jerynce Brings Plenty as Jerynce (season 4; guest season 5), Mo's teenage son.
 Piper Perabo as Summer Higgins (season 4–present), an animal rights activist who befriends John despite their contrasting viewpoints. She later serves as his environmental advisor and becomes his love interest.
 Kai Caster as Rowdy (season 5), the ranch foreman at Yellowstone in the 1990s.
 Lainey Wilson as Abby (season 5), a country music singer who befriends Ryan.
 Dawn Olivieri as Sarah Atwood (season 5), a business heavy hitter for Market Equities brought in to bring ruin to the Duttons. Olivieri also portrays Claire Dutton in 1883.
 Lilli Kay as Clara Frewer (season 5), the assistant to the Governor of Montana.

Guest Characters
 Dave Annable as Lee Dutton, John Dutton's oldest son, head of security at Yellowstone, and a sworn agent of the Montana Livestock Commission ("Daybreak", "Resurrection Day" and "Grass on the Streets and Weeds on the Rooftops")
 Kip Denton portrays a young Lee Dutton ("Blood the Boy")
 Jeremiah Bitsui as Robert Long, a US Army veteran, Monica's brother and Tate's uncle. ("Daybreak")
 Morningstar Angeline as Samantha Long, Robert's wife, and Monica's sister-in-law. ("Daybreak" and "No Good Horses")
 Stanley Peternel as Dirk Hurdstrom, Jimmy's grandfather and only living relative ("Daybreak", "Only Devils Left" and "Enemies by Monday")
 Gretchen Mol as Evelyn Dutton, the late wife of John Dutton and mother to Lee, Jamie, Beth, and Kayce, who died in a horseriding accident in 1997 ("No Good Horses" and "A Monster is Among Us")
 Geno Segers as Danny Trudeau, a man searching for his missing daughter, Daisy. ("No Good Horses")
 Rob Kirkland as Watch Commander / Sheriff Ramsey, a Watch Commander of Park County, Montana who is later promoted to Sheriff. ("Enemies by Monday", "No Such Thing as Fair" and "Tall Drink of Water")
 Dabney Coleman as John Dutton Jr., John's father ("Sins of the Father")
 Barry Corbin as Ross, an elderly cowboy at the 6666 Ranch ("Under a Blanket of Red")
 Tim McGraw as James Dillard Dutton, the great-great-grandfather of John Dutton III. McGraw reprises his role in 1883. ("Half the Money" and "No Kindness for the Coward")
 Faith Hill as Margaret Dutton, the great-great-grandmother of John Dutton III. Hill reprises her role in 1883. ("No Kindness for the Coward")

References

External links
 
 

Lists of drama television characters